David Sherman Romasko (born November 3, 1963) is a former American football tight end who played for the Cincinnati Bengals of the National Football League (NFL). He played college football at University of Idaho and Carroll College. He was also a member of the New York Jets.

References

Further reading
 

Living people
American football tight ends
Idaho Vandals football players
Carroll Fighting Saints football players
1961 births
Players of American football from Idaho
Cincinnati Bengals players
National Football League replacement players